Károly Király (26 September 1930 – 4 November 2021) was a Romanian politician. A member of the Communist Party of Romania and, after the Romanian Revolution, of the Democratic Alliance of Hungarians in Romania, he served in the Great National Assembly from 1969 to 1973 and the Senate of Romania from 1990 to 1992.

References

1930 births
2021 deaths
Romanian Communist Party politicians
Democratic Union of Hungarians in Romania politicians
People from Târnăveni
Members of the Great National Assembly
Members of the Senate of Romania